Ballynennan Moon was a famous racing greyhound during World War II. He is regarded as being the one of the greatest racing greyhounds and was denied the opportunity to win the English Greyhound Derby because of the postponement of the event during the war years.

Racing career

1939 & 1940
He was born just before the start of the war in April 1939 and was owned and trained by leading Irish trainer Billy Quinn. His first significant win in Ireland was the North Kilkenny Stakes and his first twenty races resulted in eight wins.

His last race in Ireland was at Shelbourne Park where he broke the 29 second barrier. Leading owner Mrs Jessie Cearns (the wife of the Managing Director of Wimbledon, W.J. Cearns) purchased him and put him with trainer Sidney Orton.

1941
His first two races in 1941 ended in a major success when he won the Wembley Summer Cup. He won five more races before suffering from illness and being laid off until 1942.

1942 & 1943
Reappearing in January 1942 he claimed the Walthamstow Stakes and Wimbledon Spring Cup. The ease in which he won his races endured him to the British wartime public and he became a welcome distraction from the war. His following 48 races resulted in a remarkable 40 wins and 7 runner-up spots. Ballynennan Moon was fourteen unbeaten and heading towards Mick the Miller’s world record of 19 when he was beaten by Laughing Lackey by a neck. He was to take part in 80 consecutive weeks of racing winning numerous competitions.

1944
He won another ten races in a row before being beaten by Laughing Lackey (the only greyhound that seemed capable of getting close to him. He retired to stud in 1944 after pulling up lame in the Stewards Cup.

Retirement
He was the first greyhound at stud to command a 100 guineas mating fee. He won 65 races out of 91 and won 38 trophies winning over £4,000 in prize money.

Pedigree

References

Greyhound racing in the United Kingdom
Racing greyhounds
1939 animal births